Skrjabinema is a genus of nematodes within the Oxyuridae family. Species of this genus typically parasitise ruminants. For example the nematode Skrjabinema ovis invades the intestinal tract of the guanaco, Lama guanicoe, subsequent to the ingestion of eggs of this worm.

Notes

References 
 Chemical Institute of Canada. 1934. Canadian Journal of Research, National Research Council of Canada, v.10 Jan-Jun
 C. Michael Hogan. 2008. Guanaco: Lama guanicoe, GlobalTwitcher.com, ed. N. Strömberg

Oxyurida
Secernentea genera